Paul Martínez Pompa is a Latino poet.

The author of My Kill Adore Him (University of Notre Dame Press, 2009), (selected by Martín Espada for the 2008 Andrés Montoya Poetry Prize) and the chapbook Pepper Spray (Momotombo Press, 2006). Martinez Pompa's poetry and prose have been anthologized in Telling Tongues and The Wind Shifts: New Latino Poetry.  He earned degrees from the University of Chicago and Indiana University, where he served as a poetry editor for Indiana Review. Martinez Pompa currently teaches at Triton College in River Grove, Illinois.

External links
 Review of My Kill Adore Him at the Poetry Foundation Blog

References 

American male poets
Hispanic and Latino American poets
Hispanic and Latino American writers
Living people
Chapbook writers
21st-century American poets
21st-century American male writers
University of Chicago alumni
Indiana University alumni
Year of birth missing (living people)